Mayank Mishra (born 9 October 1990) is an Indian cricketer. He made his List A debut for Uttarakhand in the 2018–19 Vijay Hazare Trophy on 20 September 2018. He made his first-class debut for Uttarakhand in the 2018–19 Ranji Trophy on 12 November 2018. He made his Twenty20 debut for Uttarakhand in the 2018–19 Syed Mushtaq Ali Trophy on 28 February 2019.

References

External links
 

1990 births
Living people
Indian cricketers
Uttarakhand cricketers
Cricketers from Uttarakhand
Place of birth missing (living people)